Dr. Ed Huckeby, (b. 1948) is an American composer, musician, conductor, and educator.

Biography 

Huckeby's career in music began in 1968, which marked the start of his eight years teaching music to students in public schools throughout Oklahoma. In 1976, Huckeby was appointed a professor at Northwestern Oklahoma State University, where he would later become music department chair, director of educational outreach, and, in 1990, dean of the graduate school.  In 1998–99, Huckeby served as the executive director of Tulsa Ballet (Tulsa, Oklahoma) prior to becoming the associate vice president for academic affairs at Northeastern State University (Broken Arrow, Oklahoma) on July 1, 1999.  In January 2010, he became the president of Southwestern Christian University, located in Bethany, Oklahoma.

Huckeby's skills as a musician include the mastery of many instruments, including the horn, the trumpet, the bass guitar, the organ, the piano and vocals. He has served in a symphony orchestra, a jazz band, and a Christian quintet.

Compositions 

Concert Band                                                   
                            
Academic Processional & Recessional
Acclamations
Accolada
American Folk Fantasia
And We Proceeded On
Annandale Chronicles
Antecedium
El Arco De Los Cabos
Ascentium
Bridgeview Overture
By the Rivers of Babylon
Canticle of the Saints
Celebrations
Concertante for Winds
Declaration, Ballade & Finale
Explorations
Eye of the Falcon
Fanfare and Toccata
Fanfare, Hymn and Dedication
Fiera Winds
For thy Courts Above
From Whom All Blessings Flow
Glorioso
God Rest You Merry, Gentleman
The Golden Circle
Good Tidings To All
Heroic Sketches
In a Japanese Garden
Innova
Intrada and Festival
Intrada, Recitative and Rondo
Jubiloso
Legend of the Ida Glenn
Let There Be Peace On Earth
Lexicon
The Magic of Mozart
March of the Roughnecks
Mind Sets
Of A Distant Star
On Angel Wings
On Wings of Eagles
Ouverture Internationale
Overtura
Overture to a New Millennium
Pastorale
Pine River Trilogy
Prelude and Primal Danse
Prelude, Opus 28, No.4
Prima Rock
Proclamation & Symphonic Decree
Prologue and Festiva
Ring the Bells on Christmas Day
The Road To Damascus
Septagon
Silent Noon
Still, Still, Still
The Spirit of Christmas
Spirit of the Heartland
Spirit of Unity
Symphonium
Three Southern Vignettes
Vignettes De La Vie
West Salem Winds
What Child is This?
When The Tears Fell

Young Band

Abington Ridge
Addison Way
American Folk Dance
American Patrol
American Volunteers
Ancient Echoes
Angel Flight
Angela's Song
Animoso
Antigua Bay
Ashland Park
Away In A Manger
Beyond the Stars
Blue Lake Reflections
Bolero Africana
Brandon Bay
Cambrian Overture
Celebrata
Chant and Celebration
Christmas Cheer
Concentra
Contempra
Covenant
Crystal Medallion Overture
Danza Espanol
Deck the Halls With Chips and Salsa
Dreamscape
Drummin' Surf-ari
Equinox
Erika's Dream
Evening Portrait
Exclamations
Faces of the World
Falcon Ridge
Fernando's Fandango
The First Breath Of Spring
Follow the Star
Foxfire
Heartland Legacy
Horn-A-Plenty
Introduction and Rondo
Journey to Centaurus
Joyant Winds
Joyful and Triumphant
Kidz' Klassix
The King's Court
King's Mountain Adventure
Kitty Hawk
Knights of the Round Table
Knock Before You Rock
Leader of the Class
Let Freedom Ring!
Lost Creek Adventure
March Britannia
March of the Kangaroos
Marching Down Main Street
Matrix March
Modal Episode
My Favorite Time of the Year
Mystic Visions
Themes From the Nutcracker
Northwest Territory
Of Courage And Valor
One Christmas Night
One O'Clock Rock
Oxford Pointe
The Phantom Train
Rising Star
Royal Empire
Sagebrush Saga
Santa Loves To Cha-Cha
Santa's Sleigh Ride
Saxsational!
The Secrets of McDougal's Cave
Shades of Gold
Shawnee Creek Legend
Slide Show
Slippery Slide Rag
Smokey Mountain Rhapsody
Spirit of the Sphinx
Starwatcher
Stone Creek Episode
Stone Mountain Fantasy
Super Mom Symphony
Taco Time
Tool Time Tango
Uncle Buck's Truck
Woodland Hills*

Jazz Ensemble

Struttin'

Marching Band

Bravio!
Charges, Cheers! And Other Fun Stuff
Energize!
Fight Song
Gettin' Busy
Have You Got That Spirit?
Hot Shot!
Impact Zone!
Journey of the Cosmic Centurions
Kick Start
Let Freedom Ring!
Power Station
Ragtime Rockin' Roll
Rock It!
Rollin' In My Sweet Baby's Arms
7th Street Swing
Struttin'
Talkin' Back
Trailblazer
Turbo Rock
Whiz Kids

See also 
James Swearingen
Robert W. Smith

References 

1948 births
Living people
American male composers
21st-century American composers
Northwestern Oklahoma State University faculty
Northeastern State University faculty
Presidents of Southwestern Christian University
21st-century American male musicians